Gabrovka is a settlement in the Municipality of Litija in central Slovenia. The area is part of the traditional region of Lower Carniola. It is now included with the rest of the municipality in the Central Sava Statistical Region; until January 2014 the municipality was part of the Central Slovenia Statistical Region. In addition to the center of the settlement, formerly known as Sveti Križ pri Litiji, it includes the hamlets of Orešje, Pretržje (in older sources also Pretežje), and Trzne.

Church

The local parish church is dedicated to the Exaltation of the Cross and belongs to the Roman Catholic Diocese of Novo Mesto. It was built in the late 18th century and extended in 1913.

Notable people
Notable people that were born or lived in Gabrovka include:
Jože Borštnar (a.k.a. Gabrovčan) (1915–1998), Slovene Partisan and people's hero of Yugoslavia
Ciril Jeglič (1897–1988), technical writer and horticultural expert
Marko Marin (1930–2015), theater director, art historian, professor, and restoration expert
Franc Miglič (1855–1925), musician and composer
Anton Petje (born 1932), actor who received two Borštnik Ring Awards for his performances.

References

External links

Gabrovka on Geopedia

Populated places in the Municipality of Litija